(d. May 3, 1674 at Kyōto) was a 17th-century Japanese traveler, merchant and pilgrim, who made a journey to Cambodia, and in January 1632 visited the temple of Angkor Wat at Angkor. At that time, the temple was thought by the Japanese visitors as the famed Jetavana garden of the Buddha, located in the kingdom of Magadha. Ukondayu Kazufusa was a member of the Morimoto family.

In Angkor, there were altogether 14 inscriptions left by Japanese pilgrims between 1612 and 1632 CE. Among these inscriptions, the best-known inscription was Kazufusa's, telling that he celebrated the Khmer New Year in Angkor in 1632. The merchant-pilgrims belonged to the Japanese cities of Higo (肥後), Hizen (肥前国), Hirado (平戸) and Nagasaki (長崎), but some came also from Sakai (堺) and Ōsaka (大阪).

Notes

References
 Ishizawa, Yoshiaki: Les inscriptions calligraphiques japonaises du XVIIe siècle à Angkor Vat et le plan du Jetavana-vihāra, in: Manuel d’épigraphie du Cambodge. Eds.: Yoshiaki Ishizawa, Claude Jacques, Khin Sok. Avec la collaboration de: Uraisi Varasarin, Michael Vickery, Tatsuro Yamamoto. Vol. I, Paris 2007, pp. 169–179.

External links
 Au-dela du plan Japonais du XVII siècle d'Angkor Vat, A 17th century Japanese map of Angkor Wat, Abdoul-Carime Nasir 

1674 deaths
17th-century Japanese people
Khmer Empire
17th-century explorers